Microhyla achatina, commonly known as the Javan chorus frog, Java rice frog, or Javanese narrow-mouthed frog, is a species of narrow-mouthed frog endemic to Java, Indonesia.

Description 
Microhyla achatina is a small species with a narrow head. Its eyes are small and the feet have partially webbed digits. It is yellowish brown on the dorsal side with two dark stripes, with a symmetric arrow-shaped mark and sometimes a narrow pale line along the spine. The sides are dark.

Habitat and distribution 
This is a frog of primary and secondary forest, sometimes found around human developments, such as paddy fields and forest gardens.

This frog is endemic to Java and is found in the central and western parts of the island.

Biology
The diet of this frog consists of ants, termites and many other tiny insects.
It breeds in ponds, permanent pools or marshy areas and the males call at night, several neighboring frogs making a chorus and producing a song that sounds like the sounds made by crickets. The call has a frequency of between 3 and 3.2 kHz, with a pulse rate of 14–20 pulses per second, and a duration of less than a second. Females lay small clutches of about 20 eggs.

Status
This frog has a relatively wide range and the population seems to be stable so the IUCN rates it as being of "Least Concern" as it considers that the rate of decline, if any, is insufficient to justify listing it in a more threatened category. It is to some extent tolerant of forest degradation and no particular threats to this species have been identified.

Pictures

References

 Iskandar, D.T.  1998. Amfibi Jawa dan Bali.  Puslitbang Biologi LIPI, Bogor.

achatina
Amphibians of Indonesia
Endemic fauna of Java
Amphibians described in 1838
Taxa named by Johann Jakob von Tschudi